Carl Henrik Meinander (born 19 May 1960 in Helsinki), is a Finnish historian, PhD 1994. From 2002 Meinander is the keeper of the Swedish-speaking professorship in history (after Matti Klinge) at Helsinki University. He is the son of the famous archaeologist Carl Fredrik Meinander.

In , part 4 (1999) he appears as an unbiased interpreter of the Finnish republics history. He has also engaged himself in the public debate as columnist in the newspaper Hufvudstadsbladet.

He has been a foreign member of the Royal Swedish Academy of Sciences since 2002.

References

External links 

 Helsinki University: Henrik Meinander
 Henrik Meinander, personal website

1960 births
Living people
Swedish-speaking Finns
20th-century Finnish historians
Members of the Royal Swedish Academy of Sciences
University of Helsinki alumni
Academic staff of the University of Helsinki
21st-century Finnish historians